An Eskimo rescue, bow rescue or T-rescue is a kayaking technique performed to recover a kayaker from a capsize without them having to leave their boat or perform a self-rescue such as a kayak roll. The advantages of this manoeuvre are that the kayaker does not have to get out of the kayak and the kayak does not then have to be emptied of water. However, it relies on another kayaker being able to assist quickly enough. More advanced kayakers will often prefer to rely on a kayak roll instead.

Technique 
After drawing attention to the capsize by banging on the bottom of their boat, the kayaker who capsized waits upside down underwater until another kayak arrives to help. The capsized kayaker finds the other kayak, usually the bow, with their hand and uses this for support while they perform a hip-flick to right their kayak. If the kayaker runs out of breath before managing to complete the eskimo rescue, as sometimes happens, they will exit their kayak by releasing their spray deck.

Naming 
An eskimo rescue is often used synonymously with T rescue and bow rescue, these names come from the shape the boats make (a T) and the part of the boat that is presented to the capsized kayaker respectively. However, an eskimo rescue is really the general term for any rescue in which a capsized kayaker is righted with help from another.

References 

Kayaking techniques